Garong can refer to:

Garong, a type of cargo-carrying motorized tricycle in the Philippines
Garong, a village in the Tibet Autonomous Region